ARPCE — state market regulator of the post and electronic communications in the Republic of the Congo. The agency is located in Brazzaville, Republic of the Congo.

See also
 Type Approval Services for Congo

References 

Regulation in the Republic of the Congo
Communications authorities